is a former Japanese football player.

Club career
Funakoshi was born in Kobe on June 12, 1977. After graduating from high school, he joined Gamba Osaka in 1996. He moved to Eerste Divisie club Telstar on loan in 1996. Although he returned to Gamba in 1997, he could hardly play in the match and he moved to Bellmare Hiratsuka (later Shonan Bellmare) in 1999 and Oita Trinita in 2001. At Trinita, he played many matches. He moved to Albirex Niigata in 2002. Although he played many matches until 2003, he could hardly play in the match from 2004. He moved to Tokyo Verdy in 2007 and played until 2009. He played for SC Sagamihara in 2010 and retired at the end of the 2010 season.

National team career
In August 1993, Funakoshi was selected Japan U-17 national team for 1993 U-17 World Championship. He played full-time in all 4 matches and scored a goal against Mexico.

Club statistics

References

External links

1977 births
Living people
Association football people from Hyōgo Prefecture
Japanese footballers
Japan youth international footballers
J1 League players
J2 League players
Gamba Osaka players
Shonan Bellmare players
Oita Trinita players
Albirex Niigata players
Tokyo Verdy players
SC Sagamihara players
Japanese expatriate footballers
Association football forwards